Kuala Lumpur Rovers Football Club, or simply known as the KL Rovers FC,  is a Malaysian professional football club based in Kuala Lumpur, Malaysia. The team plays in the second division in Malaysian football, the Malaysia M3 League.

Players

First-team squad

Season by season record

Notes:  Season cancelled due to the COVID-19 pandemic.

Club personnel

 Team manager: Shahrir Mois
 Head coach: Wan Mustafa Wan Ismail
 Assistant coach: Haswanis Che Hassan
 Goalkeeping coach: Khairul Nizam Taib
 Fitness coach: Hafizi Salim
 Physio: Fadli Kamarulzaman
 Media officer: Raja Munawir Raja Baharuddin

Honours
League

 Domestic competitions 
 League 
 M3 League'
Runners-up: 2022

References

Malaysia M3 League
Football clubs in Malaysia